"Don't Lose My Number" is a song by Phil Collins from his third solo album No Jacket Required. The single was not released in the UK, though it peaked at No. 4 in the U.S. in September 1985. The B-side, "We Said Hello Goodbye" was released as a bonus track on the CD for No Jacket Required.  In Australia, the single was released with the title "(Billy) Don't Lose My Number".

History
Collins has stated that the lyrics to "Don't Lose My Number" were improvised, and that he himself does not fully understand what they mean. Stephen Holden of the New York Times also agreed that the lyrics were very "vague, sketching the outlines of a melodrama but withholding the full story". The song prominently features Collins' signature gated reverb drum sound.

Reception
Cash Box said that the song "merges a Motown drive with the singer/songwriter’s own it charm and vocal urgency."  Billboard said that it was a "slightly mysterious DOR tune."

Music video
Collins did not know what to use as a theme for the song's music video, so he decided that it would show his decision process in selecting a theme for it. In the video, Collins talks to various "directors", who all give him ill-fitting ideas for the video. Their suggestions allow Collins to parody several other music videos of the time, including videos by David Lee Roth ("California Girls"), Elton John ("I'm Still Standing"), The Police ("Every Breath You Take"), and The Cars ("You Might Think"), as well as movies such as Mad Max 2 and various samurai movies and Westerns. His wife at the time, Jill Tavelman, makes a cameo in the beach scene as the model who smiles at him.

Track listing

7": Atlantic / 7-89536 (US)
"Don't Lose My Number" (4:46)
"We Said Hello Goodbye" (4:15)

7": WEA / 7-259001 (Australia)
"(Billy) Don't Lose My Number" (4:46)
"We Said Hello Goodbye" (4:15)

12": Atlantic / 0-86863 (US) 
"Don't Lose My Number" (Extended Mix) (6:36)
"Don't Lose My Number" (LP Version) (4:46)
"We Said Hello Goodbye" (4:15)

12": WEA / 0-259001 (Australia) 
"(Billy) Don't Lose My Number" (Extended Mix) (6:36)
"We Said Hello Goodbye" (4:15)

CD: WEA International / WPCR 2063 (Japan)
"Don't Lose My Number (Edit)" (4:11)
"We Said Hello Goodbye" (4:15)

Charts

Weekly charts

Year-end charts

Personnel 
 Phil Collins – vocals, keyboards, drums, LinnDrum
 David Frank – additional keyboards
 Daryl Stuermer – guitars
 Leland Sklar – bass guitar

See also
1985 in music

References

External links

1985 singles
Atlantic Records singles
Phil Collins songs
Song recordings produced by Hugh Padgham
Song recordings produced by Phil Collins
Virgin Records singles
1985 songs
Songs written by Phil Collins